Ectoedemia gymnosporiae is a moth of the family Nepticulidae. It was described by Vári in 1955. It is known from South Africa (it was described from Pretoria).

The larvae feed on Maytenus heterophylla.

References

Endemic moths of South Africa
Nepticulidae
Moths of Africa
Moths described in 1955